Madelyn Ruby Ventura de León (born 13 February 1997) is a Guatemalan footballer who plays as a striker for Huehuetecas.

Career

In 2018, Ventura signed for Spanish side Zaragoza CFF. In 2021, she signed for Suchitepéquez in Guatemala after receiving offers from Greece, Costa Rica, Colombia, and Italy, helping them win their only league title.

References

External links

 Madelyn Ventura at playmakerstats.com

1997 births
Expatriate women's footballers in Spain
Guatemalan expatriate sportspeople in Spain
Guatemalan women's footballers
Living people
Women's association football forwards
Zaragoza CFF players